Nicolás Mauricio Zalazar (born 29 January 1997) is an Argentine professional footballer who plays as a centre-back for Defensa y Justicia.

Career

Club
Zalazar was promoted into San Lorenzo's first-team squad under manager Diego Aguirre during the 2016–17 Argentine Primera División campaign, making his debut against Newell's Old Boys on 30 October 2016. He subsequently made four further appearances in his opening season. In July 2018, Zalazar joined Atlético de Rafaela of Primera B Nacional on loan.

International
Zalazar won four caps for the Argentina U20 team at the 2017 South American Youth Football Championship, the first of which arrived versus eventual winners Uruguay on 21 January.

Career statistics
.

References

External links

1997 births
Living people
Argentine footballers
Argentine expatriate footballers
Footballers from Buenos Aires
Argentina youth international footballers
Argentina under-20 international footballers
Association football defenders
Argentine Primera División players
Primera Nacional players
TFF First League players
San Lorenzo de Almagro footballers
Atlético de Rafaela footballers
All Boys footballers
Club Atlético Platense footballers
Bursaspor footballers
Defensa y Justicia footballers
Ñublense footballers
Chilean Primera División players
Expatriate footballers in Chile
Argentine expatriate sportspeople in Turkey
Expatriate footballers in Turkey